Britta Gröndahl (1914–2002) was a Swedish writer, French language teacher, editor, translator, and anarcho-syndicalist.

Works 
 Här talar syndikalisterna (1973)
 Parti eller fackförening? (1975)
 De ideologisk motsättningarna i den spanska syndikalismen 1910-36|De ideologiska motsättningarna i den spanska syndikalismen 1910-36 (1981)
 Herre i eget hus - om självförvaltning i Spanien och Portugal (1982)
 Frihetlig kommunism i praktiken (1986)
 Pierre-Joseph Proudhon: socialist, anarkist, federalist (1988)
 Äventyrens år (1994)

References 

 Vahlquist, Staffan. "Britta Gröndahl, 1914–2002", in the Swedish Lexicon of Translators
 Obituary by Inger Raaby, printed in Dagens nyheter on December 12, 2002, and in Arbetaren, 2002:48Dagens Nyheter
 Article on the Yelah.net text archive (31/12 1994)
 Lindblom, Per (2014). Anarkosyndikalismens återkomst i Spanien - SAC:s samarbete med CNT under övergången från diktatur till demokrati
 

Anarcho-syndicalists
1914 births
2002 deaths
Anarcha-feminists
Anarchist writers
20th-century translators
20th-century Swedish women writers
20th-century non-fiction writers
Syndicalists
Translators from Dutch
Translators from French
Translators from Spanish
Translators to Swedish
Swedish translators
Swedish trade unionists
Swedish anarchists
Swedish socialist feminists